Frank Shufflebottom (born 9 October 1917, date of death unknown) was an English professional footballer who played as a right back.

Career
Born in Chesterfield, Shufflebottom began his career at Margate, before turning professional with Ipswich Town in June 1936. Over the next three seasons Shufflebottom made a total of 43 appearances in the Southern Football League. His career was interrupted by World War Two; he signed for Nottingham Forest in June 1939, but didn't make an official appearance until the Football League began again in 1946. During and immediately after the War, Shufflebottom was a guest player for Scottish clubs Raith Rovers, Kilmarnock and Dundee United. He moved to Bradford City in October 1946, making 56 league appearances over the next two years.

References

1917 births
Year of death missing
English footballers
Margate F.C. players
Ipswich Town F.C. players
Nottingham Forest F.C. players
Bradford City A.F.C. players
Southern Football League players
English Football League players
Dundee United F.C. wartime guest players
Raith Rovers F.C. wartime guest players
Kilmarnock F.C. wartime guest players
Association football fullbacks